The Cretan frog (Pelophylax cretensis) is a species of frog in the family Ranidae. It is endemic to Greece.

Description

A medium-sized frog reaching up to 6.5 cm in length. The Cretan frog is generally light grey to brown and mottled with brown or olive-grey spots on its back, while the throat and underside of the body are whitish-grey. Occasionally, the upperparts of the Cretan frog may be grass-green with distinct brown spots. The insides of the hind legs are yellow, and the sides of the body may also have yellowish colouration. This species has a prominent dark brown fold of skin down the back.

Its natural habitats are Mediterranean-type shrubby vegetation, rivers, intermittent rivers, swamps, freshwater lakes, intermittent freshwater lakes, freshwater marshes, intermittent freshwater marshes, and plantations. It is threatened by habitat loss.

Sources

Amphibians of Europe
Pelophylax
Endemic fauna of Greece
Amphibians described in 1994
Taxonomy articles created by Polbot